Lieutenant-General Sir Cyril Frederick Charles Coleman,  (16 April 1903 – 17 June 1974) was a senior British Army officer.

Early life
Charles Coleman was born in Stonehouse, Plymouth, Devon, in 1903, the son of Albert Edward Coleman of Downderry, Cornwall, and Adelaide Maxwell Moore, of Seaforth, Lancashire. He was educated at Plymouth College and at the Royal Military College, Sandhurst, and was commissioned as a second lieutenant into the Welch Regiment in 1923.

Military career
Coleman served with his regiment in China, Malaya and India during the interwar period. On 30 August 1925 he was promoted to lieutenant. He was appointed adjutant of the 2nd Battalion of his regiment from 1932 to 1935.

During the Second World War, Coleman commanded the 4th Battalion, Welch Regiment from 1941 to 1944 and took over as acting commander of the 160th Infantry Brigade, his battalion's parent formation, in late 1943, before Brigadier Lashmer Whistler arrived in January 1944 to take command, with Coleman returning to commanding the 4th Welch. In June 1944 Coleman succeeded Whistler, who had been reassigned to command the 3rd Division, in command of the brigade, leading it throughout the campaign in North-West Europe from Normandy very nearly to the borders of Denmark by way of Falaise, Antwerp, Nijmegen, 's-Hertogenbosch, Wessem, the Ardennes, the Reichswald, the Rhine, the Weser, and Hamburg. He was awarded the Distinguished Service Order (DSO) in 1945 and the Dutch Knight 4th Class of the Military Order of William in 1947. As his brigade major wrote after his death, the respect the men of the brigade had for him "probably gave him as much pleasure and satisfaction as any of his later achievements".  Certainly he wrote very warmly of the achievements of the 53rd (Welsh) Infantry Division, of which his brigade formed a part, in his preface to the history of its part in the Second World War, published in 1955, and as its author makes clear, he made a considerable contribution to this account.

In 1945, Coleman briefly served as the acting General Officer Commanding (GOC) of the 53rd Division. In 1946 he attended the Staff College, Camberley before returning to command the 160th Brigade from 1947 to 1948. From 1949 to 1951 he was GOC South-Western District and 43rd (Wessex) Infantry Division. He was appointed a Companion of the Order of the Bath (CB) in 1950. He served as Commandant of the British Sector in Berlin from 1951 to 1954 and was appointed a Companion of the Order of St Michael and St George (CMG) in 1954. From 1954 until 1956 he served as Chief of Staff to the Northern Army Group (British Army of the Rhine). He was appointed a Knight Commander of the Order of the Bath (KCB) in 1957. His final appointment was as GOC-in-C Eastern Command from 1956 to 1959. He served as colonel of the Welch Regiment from 1958 to 1965.

Coleman retired from the army in 1959, but he was appointed to serve as the Lieutenant-Governor and Commander-in-Chief of Guernsey from 1964 to 1969.

Coleman played hockey for Wales and was a keen shot. He married Margaret Mary, daughter of Bruce Petrie of Singapore, in 1935. They had three daughters.

Coleman died on 17 June 1974 in the Cambridge Military Hospital, Aldershot and was buried at St Mary's Church, Bentworth. He was survived by his wife.

Footnotes

External links
Generals of World War II

|-

|-

|-

|-

1903 births
1974 deaths
Burials in Hampshire
British Army lieutenant generals
British Army brigadiers of World War II
Companions of the Distinguished Service Order
Companions of the Order of St Michael and St George
Graduates of the Royal Military College, Sandhurst
Graduates of the Staff College, Camberley
Knights Commander of the Order of the Bath
Knights Fourth Class of the Military Order of William
Officers of the Order of the British Empire
People educated at Plymouth College
Military personnel from Plymouth, Devon
Welch Regiment officers
Welsh male field hockey players